The 12987 / 12988 Ajmer–Sealdah Express is a Superfast Express train belonging to Indian Railways that runs between  and  in India.

It operates as train number 12988 from Ajmer Junction to Sealdah and as train number 12987 in the reverse direction.

Service

The 12988 Ajmer–Sealdah Superfast Express covers the distance of 1642 kilometres in 27 h 5 min (60.6 km/h) and in 27 h 25 min (59.9 km/h) as 12987 Sealdah–Ajmer Superfast Express.

As the average speed of the train is above 55 km/h, as per Indian Railways rules, its fare includes a Superfast surcharge.

Route & Halts

Deen Dayal Upadhyay Jn.,,,  to Sealdah.

Traction
Both trains are hauled by a Howrah-based WAP-7 (HOG)-equipped locomotive from Ajmer Junction to Sealdah, and vice versa.

Coach composition
 2 AC II Tier
 6 AC III Tier
 1 PC – Pantry car 
 7 Sleeper coaches
 4 General
 2 End-on Generators

References

External links
 Indian Railways
 IRCTC
 IRFCA
 Ajmer–Sealdah Express

Transport in Ajmer
Transport in Kolkata
Railway services introduced in 2009
Express trains in India
Rail transport in Rajasthan
Rail transport in Uttar Pradesh
Rail transport in Bihar
Rail transport in Jharkhand
Rail transport in West Bengal